I Often Dream of Trains is the third album by Robyn Hitchcock, released in 1984. It is Hitchcock's first acoustic-based album.

After the break-up of The Soft Boys, Hitchcock recorded two solo albums — 1981's Black Snake Diamond Role and 1982's poorly received Groovy Decay — before hitting an artistic slump mitigated only by some collaborations with Captain Sensible. Hitchcock worked odd jobs, including a stint as a gardener and a journalist. Hitchcock felt compelled to return to music after listening to Wading Through a Ventilator, a 1984 EP that compiles The Soft Boys' early singles. He wanted to make a fully solo album that, he would later comment, "only I could be blamed for".

The album was recorded in the space of a few days under the working title Crystal Branches (taken from a line in the song "Winter Love", not originally included in the track listing). Hitchcock contributes vocals, acoustic and electric guitar and piano.

The vinyl album was fourteen tracks, bookended by the piano-based instrumental "Nocturne". In 1986, the album was reissued on CD with tracks taken from Hitchcock's recent B-sides. A later CD edition saw yet more extras thrown in, all of which were demos of tracks originally included, bringing the listing to a total of twenty-four tracks. A third CD edition dropped the previous demo bonus tracks, along with "Mellow Together", but added more unreleased songs.

In 2009 a live recording titled I Often Dream of Trains in New York was released by Yep Roc, recorded at a 2008 concert at which Hitchcock performed almost every song from I Often Dream of Trains, as well as other songs from the era and one contemporary song.

Reception 
Profiling the album in 2007 for The A.V. Club's "Permanent Records" feature, "an ongoing closer look at the records that matter most", Christopher Bahn wrote:

The spare, quiet, even solemn quality of Trains, which sounds like it was recorded in a church graveyard at midnight in November, proved to be the perfect framework for Hitchcock's crystalline songs. His offbeat lyrical sensibility was in particularly fine form here, laced with Freudian symbolism as well as melancholy–but sardonically funny–psychedelia.

American music critic Jim DeRogatis called the album "the best of [Hitchcock's] solo albums", while the All Music Guide to Rock said it is "one of Hitchcock's most introspective and charming records" and a "kaleidoscopic journey through a colorfully twisted world". Canadian music magazine Exclaim! called it "arguably Robyn Hitchcock's finest album".

Track listing
All songs written by Robyn Hitchcock.

Bonus tracks

Personnel
Robyn Hitchcock - vocals, acoustic and electric guitar, piano
with:
James Fletcher - saxophone on "Flavour of Night"
Chris Cox - bass on "Ye Sleeping Knights of Jesus"
Technical
Iain O'Higgins, Pascal Gabriel, Pat Collier - engineer

References

Robyn Hitchcock albums
1984 albums
Albums produced by Robyn Hitchcock
Albums about trains